Roll Play is a Canadian interactive children's television series produced by Sinking Ship Entertainment for Treehouse TV. The series tells viewers to copy the actions shown on screen. Puppets are featured, and are played by the Famous People Players. In the United States a Spanish-language version aires on V-me during the commercials. It ran from May 13, 2006 until June 16, 2012.

Characters

Season 1 
Chloe the Chicken
Frank the Crab
Chuck the Shark
Audrey the Octopus
Maurice the Monkey
Ruckus the Dog
Rosa the Rabbit
Felix the Frog
Big Henry
Alice the Elephant
Stanley the Giraffe
Egbert the Lovebird
Bear
Snake
Charlotte the Squirrel
Oscar the Owl
Strummer the Raccoon
George the Mouse
Giga the Giganotosaurus

Season 2 
Lola the Mermaid
Lucy the Woodpecker
Conrad the Goat
Frances the Pig
Arjun the Beaver
Darrell the Possum
Diego the Praying Mantis
Albert the Ant
Michelle the Hammerhead Shark
Veronica the Dolphin
Amelia the Hedgehog
Shelley the Tortoise
Snake
Robot
Sheila the Pirate
Screamer the Hyena
Manny the Tasmanian Devil
Sam the Pterodactyl

Kids

Season 1 
 Madison (Pink tank top with blue shorts)
 Jamilla (Blue t-shirt with orange pants)
 Max (Green t-shirt with black pants)
 Diego (Orange t-shirt with black pants)
 Alycia (Purple t-shirt with yellow shorts)
 Bobby (Red t-shirt and blue shorts)
 Savien (Yellow tank top with red shorts)
 Kevin (Grey t-shirt with green shorts)
 Emily Yeung (Black t-shirt with blue pants)
 Nicole (White t-shirt with hot pink shorts)
 Justin (Blue tank top with gray pants)
 Catherine (Pink t-shirt with blue leggings)

Season 2 
 Ari Aben
 Joanna and Julia Alphonso
 Rouzbeh Aslanbick
 Stella Azzopardi
 Niklaus Boatswain
 Izzy Bryan
 Julian and Rosie Ella
 Logan Giancotti
 Aidan Gowan
 Jake Haines
 Abigail Humphreys
 Julian Karan
 Andronika Kelso
 Jacob Khoe
 Cassandra Kumah
 Iris Kwom
 Isaac Manshoong
 Athena Matthews
 Anthony and Shelby O’Coin
 Johnathan On
 Trevon and Tristan Samuel
 Joshua Smith
 Ethan Thomas
 Isaiah Vassel
 Ella Walcer

Season 3 
 Maya Adamski
 Jaeda Ahuja
 Amiera Black
 Hannah Dempsey
 Trinity Henry
 Andrew Hill
 Emily Lizano
 Graeme Lloyd
 Jacob Metcalfe
 Aamil Moolla
 Yasin Rehmanji
 Christien Shepherd
 Dillon Soin
 Kendra Tapp-Perry
 Tai Young

References

External links

 Sinking Ship

2000s Canadian children's television series
2010s Canadian children's television series
2000s preschool education television series
2010s preschool education television series
2006 Canadian television series debuts
2012 Canadian television series endings
Canadian preschool education television series
Canadian television shows featuring puppetry
Television series about children
Television series about mammals
Television series about birds
Television series about arthropods
Television series about fish
Television series about reptiles and amphibians
Treehouse TV original programming
Television series by Corus Entertainment